Montague Independent School District is a public school district based in Montague, Texas (USA). Montague ISD operates one school for grades K-8.

In 2009, the school district was rated "recognized" by the Texas Education Agency.

The district changed to a four-day school week in fall 2022.

See also
 Non-high school district

References

External links

School districts in Montague County, Texas
Public K–8 schools in Texas